Cryphia labecula is a moth of the family Noctuidae. It is found in the Lebanon mountain range the adjacent southern part of Turkey and Mount Hermon in the Golan Heights.

Adults are on wing from May to June. There is probably one generation per year.

The larvae feed on lichen from old trees.

External links
The Acronictinae, Bryophilinae, Hypenodinae and Hypeninae of Israel

Cryphia
Moths of the Middle East
Moths described in 1855